The New Zealand women's national rugby league team, also known as the Kiwi Ferns or New Zealand Kiwi Ferns, represents New Zealand in Women's rugby league. They are administered by the New Zealand Rugby League.

New Zealand won the Women's Rugby League World Cup in 2000, 2003 and 2008.

Current squad

Squad for the World Cup in November 2022: 
The team is coached by Ricky Henry. 
Table last updated 20 November 2022 (after the Final match against Australia in the postponed 2021 Women's Rugby League World Cup).

Coaches
Also see :Category:New Zealand women's national rugby league team coaches.

 Janie Thompson 1995-1997
 Tony Lajpold 1998-1999
 Michael Rawiri 2000-
 Stan Martin 2008
 Tony Benson 2017-2018
 Justin Morgan 2018-2020
 Ricky Henry 2020–present

The current coach of the New Zealand team is Ricky Henry, who replaced Justin Morgan in 2020. Morgan had been the coach since 2018.

Results

Full internationals

Nines

Head to Head Records
Table last updated 20 November 2022. Share is the portion of "For" points compared to the sum of "For" and "Against" points.

History

1990s
The Kiwi Ferns were formed in 1995.

1995 Inaugural Kiwi Ferns Team

 Kaylene Ihaia
 Nadene Conlon
 Lynley Tierney
 Juanita Hall (c)
 Karroll Brent-Edmonson
 Eileen Rankin
 Laura Waretini
 Rachel White
 Tania Martin
 Wendy Cunningham
 Debbie Syme
 Maria Auega
 Sara White
 Leah Witehira
 Michelle Driscoll
 Zavana Aranga
 Nicole Presland
 Luisa Avaiki
 Megan Tahapeehi
 Sharlene Hannah
 Tammi Wilson
 Therese Mangos
 Eva Epiha
 Golly Baker
 Coach: Janie Thompson
 Managers: Ollie Karu and Yvonne Hiko and Maia Le Cheminant

Touring Australia in June and July 1995, the team won all seven games that they played. Two of the games were full internationals against Australia.

The First Test Match was held on 1 July 1995 at Lidcombe Oval in Sydney. New Zealand 18 (Maira Auega, Leah Witehira, Debbie Syme, Luisa Avaiki tries; Zavana Aranga goal) defeated Australia 14 (Natalie Dwyer, Julie McGuffie, Sherrilee Moulds tries; Sherrilee Moulds goal).

The Second Test was held on 8 July 1995 at Hawker Oval in Canberra. New Zealand 14 (Tammi Wilson, Leah Witehira, Laura Waretine tries; Laura Waretine goal) defeated Australia 6 (Katrina Fanning try, Sherrilee Moulds goal).

Other matches on the tour were played against the following teams:
 NSW President's XIII on 27 June at North Sydney Oval. New Zealand won 16–6.
 Sydney at Ringrose Park, Wentworthville. New Zealand 26 defeated Sydney 4. 
 Australian Capital Territory on 6 July at Freebody Oval, Queanbeyan. New Zealand 48 defeated A.C.T. nil.
 Queensland at Davies Park, Brisbane
 Queensland at Seagulls Stadium

1997 Kiwi Ferns Team

 Kaylene Ihaia
 Lemelle Lauaki
 Mate Lefale
 Priscilla Moke
 Luisa Avaiki
 Christine Moir
 Lynley Tierney
 Nadene Conlon (VC)
 Zavana Aranga (C)
 Rachel White
 Tracy Wrigley
 Trish Hina
 Michelle Driscoll
 Megan Tahapeehi
 Nicole Presland
 Mere Miki
 Selena Edmonds
 Cherie Steel
 Coach: Janie Thomson
 Managers: Diane Pakai, Robin Thompson
 Trainer: Eileen Rankin

New Zealand hosted Australia. New Zealand won both International Test games to remain undefeated for 4 Tests in a row.

1998 Kiwi Ferns Team

 Audrey Thompson
 Zavana Aranga (C)
 Nadene Conlon (VC)
 Tasha Davie
 Debbie Chase
 Alarna Nicholas
 Leah Witehira
 Serena Setu
 Rachel White
 Sara White
 Luisa Avaiki
 Trish Hina
 Somma Te Kahu
 Germaine Wiki
 Jackie Ryder
 Michelle Driscoll
 Rachel Bean
 Coach: Tony Lajpold
 Manager: Hope Weston
 Trainer: Harry Tipene

New Zealand hosted a travelling Great Britain Lionesses team. New Zealand won all 3 test matches to bring their undefeated tally to 7 in a row.

1999 Kiwi Ferns Team

 Tasha Davie
 Tracy Wrigley
 Nadene Conlon
 Leah Witehira
 Stacey O'Carroll
 Jean Kellett
 Mary Brennan
 Frances Te Ao
 Sara White
 Cynthia Ta'ala
 Rachel White
 Selena Te Amo
 Trish Hina
 Luisa Avaiki
 Antoinette Rowley
 Michelle Driscoll
 Jackie Ryder
 Zavana Aranga (C)
 Miriama Niha
 Germaine Wiki
 Coach: Tony Lajpold
 Manager: Christine Cooper
 Trainer: Eileen Porter-Rankin

The three-match series was split between two matches in Sydney and one in Auckland. New Zealand  won the First Test Match but lost the Second Test, ending their 8 Test undefeated streak.

2000s
2000 World Cup Kiwi Ferns Squad

 Somma Te Kahu
 Sharlene Johnson
 Michelle Driscoll
 Selena Te Amo
 Stacey O'Carroll
 Trish Hina
 Leah Witehira
 Nicole Presland (C)
 Tracy Wrigley
 Luisa Avaiki
 Rachel White
 Nadene Conlon (C)
 Tasha Davie
 Laura Mariu
 Ina Muaiava
 Frances Te Ao
 Hanna Wainohu
 Nola Campbell
 Miriama Niha
 Lynley Tierney-Mani
 Rachel Cooper
 Priscilla Moke
 Vicki Logopati
 Katrina Howard

 Coach: Michael Rawiri
 Trainer: Bob

New Zealand travelled to Great Britain for the Inaugural Women's Rugby League World Cup. New Zealand beat both Great Britain & Ireland and Australia in round matches, and then Australia in a semi-final to play Great Britain & Ireland in the final. New Zealand won the Final 26–4, to win the World Cup.

2003 Kiwi Ferns World Cup Squad

Sharlene Atai (Auckland), Luisa Avaiki (Captain, Auckland), Mere Baker (Canterbury), Elina Beets (Auckland), Tafale Chan Ting (Auckland), Nadene Conlon (Auckland), Sarina Fiso (Auckland), Aimee Gilbert (Wellington), Marion Heather (Auckland), Trish Hina (Wellington), Honey Hireme (Waikato), Annabelle Hohepa (Auckland), Teasha-Lee Leka (Auckland), Bodene Marino (Canterbury),  Caroline Marsters, Lorina Papali'i, Rona Peters, Cynthia Ta'ala, Rachel White, Leah Witehira (all Auckland).

2010s 
2010 Kiwi Ferns Team

The Kiwi Ferns team for the First Test against England was: Sarina Fiso; Sharlene Ata, Trish Hina, Karley Te Korua, Laura Mariu; Rona Peters,  Josephine Leef; Sharnita Woodman, Ana Pereira, Cynthia Ta’ala, Honey Hireme, Maryanne Collins. Interchange: Ebony Low, Akehene Pereira, Maryanne Hemara, Kathleen Keremete.  There were four changes to the seventeen for the Second Test, with Bridget Smith, Lorina Papalii, Charmaine McMenamim and Alisha Moses playing in that match.

2014 Kiwi Ferns Team

The Kiwi Ferns beat the Jillaroos 12 - 8 in a curtain-raiser match ahead of the Four Nations match between the Kangaroos and Samoa  at the WIN Stadium in Wollongong, Australia.

2015 Kiwi Ferns Team

The 2015 Anzac Test curtain-raiser match between the Ferns and the Jillaroos was initially to be played on 1 May but was postponed due to bad weather. The match commenced on 3 May at the Suncorp Stadium with the Jillaroos winning the match 22 - 14.

Records

Team

Individual

See also

Australia women's national rugby league team

Sources
Coverage of the New Zealand Women's Rugby League team in the following sources is intermittent until the mid-2010s. There are multiple instances of a newspaper publishing details in relation to a match or series in one year, but not of matches in following years.

References

External links
NZ Women's Rugby League nzrl.co.nz

 
Women's national rugby league teams